Dhol Faqeer (original name Dhol) son of Faqeer Muhammad Khaskheli, was born in 1921 at Patayoon, Mirpur Khas District. He was a famous mystic & folk singer of Sindh, Pakistan. He died on 22 june 1992.

Education
Dhol Faqeer did not have much education or formal schooling

Musical career
He listened to other singers at different places and learned how to sing himself from them. Later, he took training of music from Ismail Murree, Manthaar Faqeer Rajar and his grandson Wali Baksh Rajar. Dhol Faqeer was one of those singers who made Sindhi music evergreen with the combination of traditional Sindhi poetry. He considered singing as worship and charged nothing for singing. He was a disciple of Makhdoom Muhammad Zaman Talib-ul-Mola who introduced him at Radio Pakistan, Karachi Station in 1948. Producer Mohammad Baksh Ansari took him to Hyderabad whereas Abdul Karim Baloch introduced him on Pakistan Television, Karachi. His songs were mainly broadcast from Radio Pakistan, Hyderabad. He visited many countries to perform his art.

Award
Along with several regional awards, Government of Pakistan had awarded him Pride of Performance on 23 March 1989.

Death
He died of kidney failure on 22 June 1992. He is buried at Tando Allahyar in Sindh, Pakistan.

References

External links
Videoclip of Dhol Faqeer on YouTube

1921 births
1992 deaths
20th-century Pakistani male singers
Pakistani folk singers
Sindhi people
Performers of Sufi music
Sindhi-language singers
Pakistani Sufis
Recipients of the Pride of Performance
Singers from Sindh